In legal English, the seat of any organization is the center of authority.

Commercial
The seat of a corporation is the publicly registered headquarters, or registered office of a corporate entity. Also referred to as the siège reel, or head office. It is the legal center of operations, and the locale which generally determines what laws bind the corporation.

Government
A seat is a competitive position of trust, or public trust, within a government normally filled by election. The politician represents a constituency of citizens, and may hold the seat for a limited term after which the electorate votes once again to fill the seat.

At the time the politician gains authority, the politician is said to be seated. During the politician's term, they are considered to be the sitting trust of that seat. For example, from 2017 to 2021, the sitting President of the Australian Senate was Scott Ryan. If an incumbent politician fails to win an election or is removed from office, they are said to be unseated.

See also
Elections
Siège social

References 

Legal terminology